Mary Alice "Maris" Wrixon (December 28, 1916 – October 6, 1999) was an American film and television actress. She appeared in over 50 films between 1939 and 1951.

Early years
Wrixon was born in Billings, Montana, and raised in Great Falls, one of three children born to Mr. and Mrs. W.H. Wrixon. Her interest in acting was sparked by a role she had in a class play when she was a student at Great Falls High School.  

She gained acting experience at the Pasadena Community Playhouse.

Career
Wrixon first appeared in films in the late 1930s, making one film in 1938 and 10 in 1939. Between 1940 and 1942, she appeared in 29 films at Warner Brothers, alternating between uncredited parts (in films including High Sierra and Dark Victory) and supporting roles.

Wrixon worked primarily in B-movies and, in addition to her Warners films, in films produced by Poverty Row studios such as Monogram Pictures. Monogram released the film in which The New York Times says "horror fans remember her best", The Ape, which starred Boris Karloff.

Her final film was As You Were (1951).

Personal life
Wrixon was married to Oscar-nominated film editor Rudi Fehr. She died in Santa Monica, California of heart failure.

Selected filmography 

 Off the Record (1939) - Telephone Operator (uncredited)
 The Adventures of Jane Arden (1939) - Martha Blanton - Debutante
 No Place to Go (1939) - Mrs. Harriet Washburn (uncredited)
 The Private Lives of Elizabeth and Essex (1939) - Lady of the Court (uncredited)
 Jeepers Creepers (1939) - Connie Durant
 British Intelligence (1940) - Dorothy Bennett (uncredited)
 'Til We Meet Again (1940) - Girl (uncredited)
 Saturday's Children (1940) - City Hospital Nurse (uncredited)
 Flight Angels (1940) - Bonnie
 The Man Who Talked Too Much (1940) - Roscoe's Secretary
 The Ape (1940) - Miss Frances Clifford
 Knute Rockne All American (1940) - Telephone Operator (uncredited)
 Lady with Red Hair (1940) - Miss Annie Ellis (uncredited)
 Santa Fe Trail (1940) - Girl at Wedding (uncredited)
 The Case of the Black Parrot (1941) - Sandy Vantine
 High Sierra (1941) - Blonde at Auto Accident (uncredited)
 Footsteps in the Dark (1941) - June Brewster
 Meet John Doe (1941) - Autograph Hound (uncredited)
 A Shot in the Dark (1941) - Helen Armstrong
 Million Dollar Baby (1941) - Diana Bennet
 Sunset in Wyoming (1941) - Wilmetta 'Billie' Wentworth
 Bullets for O'Hara (1941) - Elaine Standish
 Navy Blues (1941) - Hawaii Pickup #2 (uncredited)
 Spy Ship (1942) - Sue Mitchell
 Sons of the Pioneers (1942) - Louise Harper
 The Old Homestead (1942) - Mary Jo Weaver
 Silent Witness (1943) - Betty Higgins, Special Investigator
 Women in Bondage (1943) - Grete Ziegler
 Phantom Lady (1944) - Blonde (uncredited)
 Waterfront (1944) - Freda Hauser
 Trail to Gunsight (1944) - Mary Wagner
 The Master Key (1945, Serial) - Dorothy Newton
 White Pongo (1945) - Pamela Bragdon
 This Love of Ours (1945) - Evelyn
 Black Market Babies (1945) - Helen Roberts
 The Face of Marble (1946) - Linda Sinclair
 The Glass Alibi (1946) - Linda Vale
 The Saxon Charm (1948) - Mrs. McCarthy (uncredited)
 Highway 13 (1948) - Mary Hadley
 As You Were (1951)
 Sea Hunt (1960, TV Series) - Edith Judd
 The Graduate (1967) - Guest at Welcoming Party (uncredited)
 Dayton's Devils (1968) - Cashier (final film role)

References

External links

 Brief biography and filmography at [http://movies2.nytimes.com/gst/movies/filmography.html?p_id=77654 The New York Times]''

1916 births
1999 deaths
American television actresses
Actresses from Montana
American film actresses
People from Billings, Montana
People from Great Falls, Montana
20th-century American actresses